Roseitalea  is a genus of bacteria from the family of Phyllobacteriaceae with one known species (Roseitalea porphyridii).

References

Phyllobacteriaceae
Bacteria genera
Monotypic bacteria genera